Jason Benoit is a country music singer-songwriter from Fox Island River, in western Newfoundland.
Benoit began pursuing his professional music career in 2013. His first single was a country rendition of the Armin van Buuren and Trevor Guthrie dance song "This Is What It Feels Like", which peaked on the Billboard Canada Country chart at number 46. The single was included on the country music compilation album, Country Heat 2014. In 2014, Benoit signed his first label deal with the newly formed JV Records/Sony Music Canada and shortly after released "Crazy Kinda Love". On March 9, 2015, Benoit released his third single, "Gone Long Gone". The latter reached the top ten on the Canadian Billboard Country chart in the summer of 2015 and was certified Gold by Music Canada shortly thereafter.

In July 2015, Benoit received the inaugural CCMA Discovery Atlantic Award from the Canadian Country Music Association.

The same year, Benoit was nominated for CCMA Rising Star and follow-up single "Cold Day Comin" reached number 21 on the Canadian Country Billboard Charts. Benoit had another top 30 in the year 2016 with "All Wanna Party" reaching number 26 on the Canadian Country Billboard Chart. 

In 2017, Benoit released the album "Waves", his final release with JV Records/Sony. This album went on to be nominated for "Country Album of the Year" at the 2017 ECMA Awards.

In 2018, Benoit was a finalist in SiriusXM "Top of the Country" in association with the CCMAs and He was the only independent Canadian Country Artist invited to walk the red carpet at the 2018 Much Music Video Awards in Toronto, ON. He signed a new record deal with independent Record Label, Vicktory Music Group and recorded critically acclaimed single "Slow Hand" Featuring Canadian Female Country singer "Leah Daniels". Benoit went on to record a 7 track EP titled "Revolution Part 1" released in 2019 which included "Slow Hand" as well as all new songs. 

In 2019, Benoit was direct tour support for the CMA Award winning Country act "Old Dominion" along with "the Washboard Union" on the eastern leg of the "Make it Sweet" tour and later that year toured with "the Washboard Union" on the Ontario leg of their tour. 

In 2020, Benoit won his first East Coast Music Award for "Fans Choice Video of the Year". He also began writing his next album with long time friend and Pei native, Gerry Foote.  Due to the Covid-19 pandemic, he began doing his bi-weekly "Friday Night Lock Down" live streams which achieved much fan support.

In 2021, Benoit won his first MusicNL award for "Indigenous Artist of the Year" which according to Benoit, was one of his "Greatest Honours". That same year, Benoit produced his first full body of work, the "Time Traveller" albums. Benoit released his first Christmas song "How Great Thou Art" with Manitoba Female Country singer, Kendra Kay. In the fall of 2021, Benoit began working with Toronto based Management team, Johnson Talent Management.

In 2022, Benoit released his first EP "Time Traveller - Side A" with the help of co-producer, fellow Newfoundlander, Clint Curtis of Sevenview Studios and distributed the album through Jayward Artist Group/the Orchard. The album was cited as some of Benoit's greatest work by SiriusXM "Canada Talks" personality, Allison Dore, stating that "..it feels like this album is a step up from anything else he's released in the past..". 

In April, 2022, Benoit was Spotify Canada's "Indigenous Artist of the Month" having his image displayed on the Eaton's Centre Spotify billboard on Young and Dundas, in Toronto, Ontario. 

In May of 2022, Benoit was featured on the Nationally televised Global TV program "ET Canada" which was a first for him since he began his career in 2013. 

Benoit has performed on the main stage at some of Canada's biggest country music festivals such as Boots and Hearts Music Fest, and Cavendish Beach Music Festival. He was the only Canadian Country Artist to Perform at the 2017 Rock the Park Music Fest in London, ON along side Lady A, Kelsea Ballerini, and Brett Younge.

Discography

Studio albums

Singles

Music videos

Awards and nominations

References

Canadian country singer-songwriters
Musicians from Newfoundland and Labrador
Living people
Year of birth missing (living people)